() is a town, with a population of 13,400 (2018 census), and a municipality, with a population of 23,017 (2018 census), in the Escuintla department of Guatemala. It is most notable for the Olmec-influenced carved stone heads from the Monte Alto culture now on display around the town square.

History 
It is said that the first settlers to make home in what is now  were the Pipil people, who seem to have passed through Guatemala on their way to El Salvador, where they currently reside. Evidence of what occurred in  can be found in archeological sites throughout the municipality.

Infrastructure 
In November 2012, the  sugar mill installed a 56 Megawatts electrical plant which was connected to the electrical mainframe of the company, which already had 125 Megawatts, in addition to the electrical distribution of the country. The installation cost a total of 7 million dollars.

Municipal Government 
On the 13 of September 2013, the municipality accused Ex-mayor Ramó Soto García of cheating the Guatemalan Institute of Social Security (IGSS) of 237,000  by falsely declaring that a relative needed medical attention as a commune worker. On the 28th of June 2015, Garcia, who at the time was once again a candidate for mayor, was captured by the Public Ministry of Guatemala. The capture was due to the suspicion that he had illicitly laundered around twelve million  in 2006. For this reason, the Guatemala Supreme Electoral Tribunal annulled his inscription as candidate for municipal mayor.

Tourism 
 is recognized for its archeological tourist sites. It is visited by many of the people of Guatemala and visitors to the country. It is also the center of study for many historians and scientists.

Notes 

Municipalities of the Escuintla Department